Jeffery Lynn Millar (July 10, 1942 – November 30, 2012) was an American comic strip writer and film critic best known for creating the Tank McNamara comic strip with illustrator Bill Hinds.

Early life and education
Millar was born in Pasadena, Texas. He earned a bachelor's degree from the University of Texas.

Career
Millar began covering entertainment for the Houston Chronicle.

Tank McNamara debuted in 1974. Millar retired from the Chronicle in 2000. 

Millar also wrote fiction, including the 1975 story “Toto, I Have a Feeling We’re Not in Kansas Anymore,” which appeared in Orbit Science Fiction. He published the thriller novel Private Sector in 1978. He co-authored a zombie story with Alex Stern titled Dead and Buried, which was adapted into the 1981 horror movie Dead & Buried.

Death and legacy
Millar died in late November 2012 due to bile duct cancer; illustrator Hinds took over the writing of Tank McNamara after Millar's death.

Shortly after Millar's death, he was posthumously awarded the 2012 Houston Film Critics Society Award for Outstanding Achievement.

References

External links
Tank McNamara via Universal Uclick

1942 births
2012 deaths
American cartoonists
American film critics